Serhii Anatoliiovych Lytvynenko (born 15 February 1968, Poltava, Ukraine) — a Ukrainian entrepreneur and politician. People's Deputy of Ukraine of the 9th convocation.

Bibliography 
Graduated from the Chernihiv Pedagogical Institute on the specialty of “physical education teacher”; Uzhhorod National University on the specialty of a lawyer; National University of Food Technologies on the specialty of “food technologies”. Engaged in commercial activities in the sphere of the agro-industrial complex. Physical entrepreneur. Director of the enterprise.

Political career  
A candidate for people’s deputies from the political party ‘Servant of the People’ in 2019 parliamentary elections (the electoral district № 156, Berezne, Kostopil and Sarny rayons of Rivne Oblast). At the time of the election: the acting director of the enterprise ‘ZIRNENSKYY SPYRTOVYY ZAVOD, DP’, lives in Berezne of Rivne Oblast. Non-party.
Date of gaining deputy’s authority: August 2019.
Faction: Member of the "Servant of the People" political party parliamentary faction.
Post: Member of the Verkhovna Rada of Ukraine Committee on Agrarian and Land Policy.

Honours  
The badge of the trade union of agro-industrial complex workers of Ukraine ‘For the development of social partnership’.

References

External links 

1968 births
Living people
Ukrainian businesspeople
Ninth convocation members of the Verkhovna Rada
21st-century Ukrainian politicians
Politicians from Poltava